Craig Boundy is Chief Executive Officer of Experian North America, a $2.4 billion company based in Costa Mesa, California. He is responsible for all Experian North America business lines, including Credit Services and Decision Analytics, Consumer Services, Vertical Markets (Automotive, Health and Public Sector) and Marketing Services. He also serves as leader of Experian’s Consumer Services business globally.

He was previously Managing Director of Experian UK and Ireland.

Before this he was Chief Executive, Global Operations at Logica then Chief Executive Officer at Logica the UK, and before that Chief Operating Officer at Cable & Wireless Europe, Asia & US.

Before joining Cable & Wireless, Craig was the Chief Operating Officer at Energis. In this role, he managed the company's financial performance and core operational processes. He moved into this position from the role of Sales Director, in which he led the company's sales force in the UK and Ireland. Source:

Craig also spent six years at British Telecom working in a range of finance, marketing and product management roles, both in the UK and overseas.

Craig went to school at St Olave's Grammar School in Orpington and then studied at Lancaster University.

Craig is a qualified basketball coach.

References

British chief executives
Living people
British Telecom people
Chief operating officers
People educated at St Olave's Grammar School
Alumni of Lancaster University
Year of birth missing (living people)